Sutter Cemetery, also known South Butte Cemetery, is located in Sutter, California.  One person of note buried here is Dolly Gray, who played major league baseball from 1909 to 1911.

References

External links
 

Cemeteries in California
Protected areas of Sutter County, California